"Sorry Somehow" is a song from Hüsker Dü's major-label debut Candy Apple Grey. It was also released an EP and as the first single from Candy Apple Grey. The song was written by Grant Hart.

EP track listing
Side One
"Sorry Somehow" (Hart)
"All This I've Done For You" (Mould)
Side Two
"Flexible Flyer" (Hart)
"Celebrated Summer" (Mould)
"Fattie" (Mould/Hart)

"Flexible Flyer" and "Celebrated Summer" were recorded live at the Roxy in Los Angeles, California.

Single track listing
Side One
"Sorry Somehow" (Hart)
"All This I've Done For You" (Mould)
Side Two
"Flexible Flyer" (Hart)
"Celebrated Summer" (Mould)

"Flexible Flyer" and "Celebrated Summer" were recorded live at the Roxy in Los Angeles, California.

References 

Hüsker Dü songs
Albums produced by Bob Mould
1986 EPs
1986 singles
Warner Records EPs
Hüsker Dü albums
Song recordings produced by Bob Mould
Songs written by Grant Hart